You & Me Forever is 2012 Danish coming-of-age drama about friendship, jealousies, and growing up.  It was directed by Kaspar Munk.  It follows Munk's 2010 film, Hold Me Tight, that addresses similar coming-of-age themes.

Plot 
Laura and Christine are both 16 years old and best friends.  But a young, more cosmopolitan girl, Maria, arrives at their school, and she proves to be mysterious and exciting.  The relationship between the three takes an intense twist as Maria acknowledges bisexual encounters.  For Laura, the new friendship upends the world she thought she knew.

Reception 
On the review aggregator website Rotten Tomatoes, the film holds an 83% approval rating, based on six reviews with an average rating of 6.67/10.

GamesRadar said, "this blisteringly realistic Danish coming-of-age drama is smarter than most and superbly performed – parental bust-ups, excruciating seductions and all."  The London Evening Standard called it "a mostly vacant film. But very pretty."  The Guardian says, "The ending is a smidge pat, but there's much to savour, especially the impressive performances of the young cast."

Autostraddle listed the film at 78 on its ranking of the 103 best lesbian films of all time.

References

External links 
 
 

LGBT-related coming-of-age films
2012 films
LGBT-related drama films
2010s coming-of-age drama films
2012 drama films
Danish coming-of-age drama films
Danish LGBT-related films

2012 LGBT-related films